The 2010 Catalan motorcycle Grand Prix was the seventh round of the 2010 Grand Prix motorcycle racing season. It took place on the weekend of 2–4 July 2010 at the Circuit de Catalunya.

MotoGP classification

Moto2 classification

125 cc classification

Championship standings after the race (MotoGP)
Below are the standings for the top five riders and constructors after round seven has concluded.

Riders' Championship standings

Constructors' Championship standings

 Note: Only the top five positions are included for both sets of standings.

References

Catalan motorcycle Grand Prix
Catalan
Catalan Motorcycle Grand Prix
motorcycle